Closer to Your Heart may refer to:

 "Closer to Your Heart" (Clannad song), 1985
 "Closer to Your Heart" (Natalie Grant song), 2014
 "Closer to Your Heart", a 2004 song by The Ladder on Future Miracles